Emlyn Jenkins (1 December 1910 – October 1993) was a Welsh cinema manager, trainee teacher, landlord of a public house, rugby union, and professional rugby league footballer who played in the 1930s and 1940s, and coached rugby league in the 1950s.

At the height of his success, Jenkins was considered a rare genius at rugby league football.

Playing career

International honours
Emlyn Jenkins won 4 caps for Wales in 1932–1936 while at Salford, won caps for England while at Salford in 1934 against Australia and France, and won caps for Great Britain while at Salford in 1933 against Australia, in 1936 against Australia (3 matches) and New Zealand (2 matches), and in 1937 against Australia (3 matches).

Wales and England
Only five rugby league footballers have played initially for Wales, and then subsequently for England, they are; Emlyn Jenkins, Gus Risman, Jim Sullivan, Les White and Garreth Carvell.

Les Diables Rouges
Emlyn Jenkins was one of the players who successfully toured in France with Salford in 1934, during which the Salford team earned the name "Les Diables Rouges", the seventeen players were; Joe Bradbury, Bob Brown, Aubrey Casewell, Paddy Dalton, Bert Day, Cliff Evans, Jack Feetham, George Harris, Barney Hudson, Emlyn Jenkins, Alf Middleton, Sammy Miller, Harold Osbaldestin, Les Pearson, Gus Risman, Billy Watkins and Billy Williams.

Club career
During Emlyn Jenkins time there was Salford's victories in the Championship in 1932–33 season, 1936–37 season and 1938–39 season, the 1938 Challenge Cup in 1937–38 season, the Lancashire County Cup in the 1929–30 season, 1931–32 season, 1934–35 season, 1935–36 season and 1936–37 season, and the Lancashire County League during the 1932–33 season, 1933–34 season, 1934–35 season, 1936–37 season and 1938–39 season.

Emlyn Jenkins made his début for Wigan in the 19–3 victory over Newcastle (away) on Saturday 12 March 1938, he scored his first try for Wigan in the 16–13 victory over Leeds at Central Park, Wigan on Saturday 19 March 1938, he scored his last try for Wigan in the 12–8 victory over Swinton in Round-1 of the Lancashire County Cup at Central Park, Wigan on Saturday 10 September 1938, he played his last match for Wigan in the 19–0 victory over Leigh at Mather Lane, Leigh on Saturday 8 October 1938. In mid-November 1938, he announced that he was retiring from the sport at the age of 27, but by the end of the month had signed to play for Keighley. He played as centre in his début for that club against Dewsbury on 5 December 1938.

Emlyn Jenkins played for St. Helens as a guest from Salford during the Wartime Emergency Leagues, and played  in St. Helens' 45–38 victory over the Rugby League Players' Union in the Testimonial match for St. Helens  Albert 'Sonny' Doyle  at Knowsley Road, St. Helens on Monday 30 April 1951.

Championship final appearances
Emlyn Jenkins played  in Salford's 3–15 defeat by Wigan in the Championship Final during the 1933–34 season at Wilderspool Stadium, Warrington on Saturday 28 April 1934.

County Cup Final appearances
About Emlyn Jenkins' time, there was Salford's 2–15 defeat by Warrington in the 1929 Lancashire County Cup Final during the 1929–30 season at Central Park, Wigan on Saturday 23 November 1929, the 10–8 victory over Swinton in the 1931 Lancashire County Cup Final during the 1931–32 season at The Cliff, Broughton, Salford on Saturday 21 November 1931, the 21–12 victory over Wigan in the 1934 Lancashire County Cup Final during the 1934–35 season at Station Road, Swinton on Saturday 20 October 1934, the 15–7 victory over Wigan in the 1935 Lancashire County Cup Final during the 1935–36 season at Wilderspool Stadium, Warrington on Saturday 19 October 1935, the 5–2 victory over Wigan in the 1936 Lancashire County Cup Final during the 1936–37 season at Wilderspool Stadium, Warrington on Saturday 17 October 1936.

Coaching

References

External links

1910 births
1993 deaths
Cardiff RFC players
England national rugby league team players
Footballers who switched code
Great Britain national rugby league team players
Keighley Cougars players
Leigh Leopards coaches
Leigh Leopards players
Publicans
Rugby league centres
Rugby league five-eighths
Rugby league fullbacks
Rugby league halfbacks
Rugby league players from Treherbert
Rugby league wingers
Rugby union players from Treherbert
Salford Red Devils players
St Helens R.F.C. players
St Helens R.F.C. coaches
Treorchy RFC players
Wales national rugby league team players
Welsh rugby league coaches
Welsh rugby league players
Welsh rugby union players
Wigan Warriors players